Borja Iradier Aguirrezabalaga (March 23, 1980 in San Sebastián, Guipúzcoa, Spain) is a Spanish breaststroke swimmer.

At the 2007 Spanish National Championships, Iradier led Day three of the championship.

References

1980 births
Sportspeople from San Sebastián
Living people
Spanish male breaststroke swimmers
Olympic swimmers of Spain
Swimmers at the 2008 Summer Olympics
Swimmers from the Basque Country (autonomous community)